Starksia variabilis is a species of labrisomid blenny known only from the Caribbean coast of Colombia where it is known to occur of reefs at a depth of about .

References

variabilis
Taxa named by David Wayne Greenfield
Fish described in 1979